Ogden is a village in Champaign County, Illinois, United States. At the time of the 2020 census, the population was 729.

Geography
Ogden is located at  (40.113693, -87.957099).

Demographics
As of the 2020 census there were 729 people, 312 households, and 192 families residing in the village. The racial makeup of the village was 97.39% White, 0.14% African American, 0.14% Asian, 0.82% from other races, and 1.51% from two or more races. Hispanic or Latino of any race were 1.78% of the population.

There were 312 households, out of which 54.81% had children under the age of 18 living with them, 43.91% were married couples living together, 8.97% had a female householder with no husband present, and 38.46% were non-families. 28.85% of all households were made up of individuals, and 16.99% had someone living alone who was 65 years of age or older. The average household size was 3.16 and the average family size was 2.48.

The village's age distribution consisted of 25.2% under the age of 18, 6.9% from 18 to 24, 24.8% from 25 to 44, 21.1% from 45 to 64, and 22.0% who were 65 years of age or older. The median age was 36.4 years. For every 100 females, there were 81.9 males. For every 100 females age 18 and over, there were 84.7 males.

The median income for a household in the village was $62,500, and the median income for a family was $80,625. Males had a median income of $48,906 versus $36,750 for females. The per capita income for the village was $29,814. About 4.7% of families and 7.4% of the population were below the poverty line, including 7.2% of those under age 18 and 14.7% of those age 65 or over.

Education
The public high school district for the community of Ogden is St. Joseph-Ogden High School #305, a school that combines the village of St. Joseph Middle School with Ogden's Prairieview-Ogden Junior High in Flatville, Illinois The local K-6 grade school is Praireview-Ogden South Elementary School #197. Some of the students in the Praireview-Ogden School District will go to neighboring high school in St. Joseph, Illinois

History

The history of Ogden started from Hickory Grove, west of Ogden, which became a campsite for many farmers. John Harmeson came from Anderson, IL to what is now Ogden; he purchased from the government 9,160 acres at $1.20 per acre. The land was divided by his sons, with John receiving the land where Ogden now stands. He sold it to one of his relatives, John Leney, in 1861. The town consisted of nine blocks between Market and Leney Streets, to Broadway and North Street. It was laid out by John Leney in 1870. The town was named after a pioneer settler, John Ogden. An agreement was made that if John sold a tract of land to the railroad company, they would name the town after him. The Ogden family lived just south of town in a log cabin. The first general store opened on June 25, 1870. Ogden had a jail on the property where the village hall now lies. Business owners in Ogden have included J.W. Alsip (general merchandise/grocery), John Alsip (livery stable), James Bensyl (livery Stable), D.E. Helton (Jewelry), Kenneth Brown (appliances/historian), and many more. Patrick and William Brennan
owned a peddler's wagon going through the countryside ringing its bell and showing many items for sale. They would buy chickens in trade because of the chicken coop attached underneath the wagon to carry them back to the store. The first newspaper in town, the Ogden Sun, began publishing in 1885. Ogden's Fire Department was organized in 1941 with Ray Richardson as chief. In 1912 resident John Rose donated the ground on which to build a town hall, stipulating that one room be reserved for a
library. Mr. Rose died in August 1916 and willed $800 to start the library. Past librarians and board members include Lena Ackerman and Florence Sadler. In 1946 the American Legion Post 998 was organized. In 1959, a lot on the northeast corner of Main and East Streets was purchased by the American Legion and plans were made for a Memorial Park which stands today in honor of Ogden war veterans. Around 1871, the Methodist and Christian Churches were erected in Ogden. The first Nazarene church
was built in Ogden in 1919. Reverend Clover Keen was the first pastor. Henry Cherry built the parsonage and later deeded it to the church. Henry Cherry's daughter, Nellie McKinney was a pianist for over 48 years. The ground for the first Ogden Methodist Episcopal Church was purchased from John and Mary Leney. A plain wooden building was erected in 1871 and was two stories high. The present Methodist Church of brick structure was built in 1920 and dedicated in 1921. The first board of trustees
included Miss Grace Alsip, J.A. Ackerman, Daniel Hahn, and others. Early roads were trails or wagon roads. When a rut became too large for comfort, all the traveler had to
do was travel elsewhere in parallel lines, where mud had not been made. By repetition of this process, roads often attained great width. In 1927-29 Route 49 was paved. The first railway in the Ogden area was an east–west line with stations in Ogden, St. Joseph, Urbana, Champaign, and Mahomet. The name of this railroad line was the Champaign-Urbana, Danville Interurban. The telephone system was established in 1899 and was owned by the local farmers. Ogden's rural route was established in 1903 with Thomas Carpenter as the first postmaster. A tornado did extensive damage to the downtown area of Ogden in March 1976, and a devastating F-3 tornado with winds estimated at 170 M.P.H. hit Ogden on April 19, 1996, leaving a path of destruction from one end of town to the other. When the 1996 tornado was over, more than 200 homes received major damage, 80 homes were completely destroyed and 13 people suffered minor injuries. With help from government agencies, surrounding communities, and thousands of volunteers; Ogden recovered under the leadership of Mayor Jack Reidner. Over the years Ogden has proven itself a resilient community with supportive and caring residents.

External links

Government
Village of Ogden website
The History of Ogden, Illinois

Education
Praireview-Ogden Elementary and Junior High school website
St. Joseph-Ogden High School Website

Houses of Worship
Ogden Church of Nazarene Facebook page
Ogden United Methodist Church Facebook page

References

Villages in Champaign County, Illinois
Villages in Illinois